The Ride Solution is a non-profit agency that provides public transportation in the city of Palatka, as well as other communities in Putnam County, Florida. The Palatka Union Depot serves as the systems hub, offering access to Greyhound and Amtrak routes. Inter-county routes connect Putnam County to Jacksonville's JTA transit system, and the Gainesville Regional Transit System. Due to the diffused population and rural nature of Putnam County, adequate public transportation is difficult to accomplish. As such, a secondary goal of Ride Solution is to address rural transportation issues.

Public Transit

 Regular bus service - City bus routes are offered in the Greater Palatka area
 Express bus service - Direct destination services with minimal intermediate stops are offered throughout the county. Inter-county express routes are also available.
 Paratransit services - special transport for the disabled and elderly.
 Vanpool - Similar to a carpool, vanpools are the most cost effective mode of public transportation in the United States.
 Park-n-Ride - Parking facilities are available in combination with express bus service.

Innovations 

 Brevi Project - Advanced rural low floor vehicle

Route Listings

Bus Route
Palatka City Route

Express Routes
SP (South Putnam Route)  Palatka / Welaka / Crescent City
CC (Cross County)  Interlachen / Palatka / Satsuma

Inter-county Routes
PC50 (Choice Ride)  Palatka / Green Cove Springs / Orange Park
PG (Palatka to Gainesville Express)  Palatka / Interlachen / Gainesville (limited service)
SAG (St. Augustine to Gainesville Express)  St. Augustine / Palatka / Gainesville

References

External links
Official website

Bus transportation in Florida
Transportation in Putnam County, Florida
Transit agencies in Florida
1986 establishments in Florida